musicMagpie is a British owned online retailer buying and selling refurbished electronics and second-hand computer games, consoles, books, films and music.

History
musicMagpie was founded in Stockport in 2007 by Steve Oliver and Walter Gleeson, both with previous experience of the music industry. The company was originally based in Oliver's garage, buying only CDs.

Records show that from February 2017, the company employed 1000 people, and received 5 million ratings on eBay, becoming the most popular seller on that platform.

By 2018 the company had sold an estimated £125 million of used items, primarily through Amazon and eBay.

Business model 
Prices are checked through an algorithm which determines an item's popularity on all competitors' websites. Due to its low prices for items such as CDs, the service is often used by individuals selling in bulk.

Customers can enter an items’ barcode or name into musicMagpie's website to receive an instant quotation. Customers can then send their goods to the company free of charge by various methods.
Once the goods are received, if they meet quality requirements, the seller is paid.

The principle behind its purchase and sale algorithm is to keep a minimum stock in the company's warehouse, and continuously buy and sell the same item while listing it on multiple platforms.
Depending on an artist's new release, advertisements and other relevant factors, the company tends to increase the stock if expecting to get bigger sales from a specific product.
DVDs are typically purchased for 1 penny and books for 20 pence, and then resold for an average of £1 or £2. 

Customers can purchase used items through a separate part of the website.

Poundland deal
The company has a deal with UK budget retailer Poundland, where it supplies them with used CDs, DVDs and Blu-rays, which are sold for one pound as part of Poundland's Replay range.

See also 
 World of Books
 Better World Books
 AbeBooks
 Alibris
 Momox

References

Companies based in Stockport
Retail companies established in 2007
Music retailers
English brands
Online retailers
Online retailers of the United Kingdom
Non-store retailing
Bookshops of the United Kingdom
Book selling websites